The Gallop Ministry was the 33rd Ministry of the Government of Western Australia, and was led by Labor Premier Geoff Gallop and his deputy, Eric Ripper. It succeeded the Court–Cowan Ministry on 16 February 2001, following the defeat of the Liberal-National coalition government at the 2001 election six days earlier. The Ministry was reconstituted on 10 March 2005 following the February 2005 election. It was succeeded by the Carpenter Ministry on 3 February 2006 due to the retirement of Dr Geoff Gallop from politics on 25 January.

First Ministry
The Governor, Ken Michael, designated 14 principal executive offices of the Government under section 43(2) of the Constitution Acts Amendment Act 1899. The following ministers and parliamentary secretaries were then appointed to the positions, and served until the reconstitution of the Ministry on 10 March 2005. The list below is ordered by decreasing seniority within the Cabinet, as indicated by the Government Gazette and the Hansard index.

 On 3 March 2001, Minister for Planning and Infrastructure Alannah MacTiernan, whose portfolio included road safety, lost her licence after being booked for driving at 98 km/h in a 60 km/h zone near Pinjarra. On 9 March 2001, Premier Gallop appointed Minister for Police Michelle Roberts as Minister assisting the Minister for Planning and Infrastructure with respect to Road Safety, meaning that Roberts would chair the Ministerial Council on Road Safety and be responsible for three Acts of Parliament.
 The parliamentary secretaries were not appointed at the same time as the rest of the Ministry. A separate announcement was made on 23 March 2001 confirming their appointments.
 On 27 June 2003, a Cabinet reshuffle removed Health from Bob Kucera and Housing and Works from Tom Stephens, reallocating the portfolios to Jim McGinty and Nick Griffiths respectively. The membership of the Cabinet remained unchanged.
 On 16 September 2004, Tom Stephens MLC resigned from the Ministry and from Parliament in order to contest the seat of Kalgoorlie at the October 2004 federal election. Kim Chance adopted the portfolios before they were reassigned to Ljiljanna Ravlich, who was promoted from parliamentary secretary to Minister on 21 September 2004.

Second Ministry
Following the state election on 26 February 2005, the Ministry was reconstituted on 10 March—the only personnel change resulted from the retirement from politics of Clive Brown.

The Governor, Ken Michael, designated 17 principal executive offices of the Government under section 43(2) of the Constitution Acts Amendment Act 1899. The following ministers and parliamentary secretaries were then appointed to the positions, and served until the reconstitution of the Ministry on 10 March 2005. The list below is ordered by decreasing seniority within the Cabinet, as indicated by the Government Gazette and the Hansard index.

 On 13 October 2005, Bob Kucera resigned from the ministry. His portfolios were assumed by Mark McGowan until 25 November 2005, when they were split between incoming minister Margaret Quirk and John Bowler.

Notes

References
 Hansard Indexes for 2001–2006, "Legislature of Western Australia"
 Government Gazettes

Western Australian ministries
Australian Labor Party ministries in Western Australia
Ministries of Elizabeth II